Vojenské spravodajstvo (English: Military Intelligence) is a military intelligence agency of the Slovak Republic operating under the Ministry of Defence. It was established on 1 January 2013 by merging the Vojenská spravodajská služba (VSS) and the Vojenské obranné spravodajstvo (VOS).

References 

Military intelligence agencies
Government of Slovakia
Military of Slovakia
Slovak intelligence agencies